Veritas, minor planet designation 490 Veritas, is a carbonaceous Veritasian asteroid, which may have been involved in one of the more massive asteroid-asteroid collisions of the past 100 million years. It was discovered by German astronomer Max Wolf at Heidelberg Observatory on 3 September 1902.

Description 

With an diameter of more than 100 kilometers, Veritas is the largest member and namesake of the Veritas family, a mid-sized asteroid family of carbonaceous asteroids in the outer main-belt, that formed recently approximately  million years ago. David Nesvorný of the Southwest Research Institute in Boulder traced the orbits of these bodies back in time, and calculated that they formed in a collision of a body at least 150 km in diameter with a smaller asteroid. Veritas and Undina would have been the largest fragments of that collision which caused a "late Miocene dust shower". The family consists of more than a thousand known members including 1086 Nata, 2428 Kamenyar and 2934 Aristophanes.

Late Miocene dust shower 

Substantiating Nesvorný's estimate, Kenneth Farley et al. found evidence in sea-floor sediments of a fourfold increase in the amount of cosmic dust reaching Earth's surface, which began 8.2 million years ago and tapered off over the next million and a half years. This is one of the largest increases in dust deposits of the past 100 million years.

The suspected Veritas collision would have been too far from Jupiter for the fragments to have been slung into a collision course with Earth. However, solar radiation would have caused the resulting dust to drift inward to Earth orbit over a time span consistent with the record of dust in the ocean sediment.

Today continuing collisions among Veritas-family asteroids are estimated to send five thousand tons of cosmic dust to Earth each year, 15% of the total.

References

External links 
 The Asteroid Veritas: An intruder in a family named after it?
 Lightcurve plot of (490) Veritas, Antelope Hills Observatory
 "Asteroid Smashup Yields Dust Shower on Earth" from SkyandTelescope.com, Jan. 20, 2006.
 
 

Veritas asteroids
Veritas
Veritas
C-type asteroids (Tholen)
Ch-type asteroids (SMASS)
19020903